Gymnopilus aculeatus is a species of mushroom-forming fungus in the family Hymenogastraceae. Originally described in 1890 as a species of Pholiota, it was transferred to genus Gymnopilus by mycologist Rolf Singer in 1951.

See also

 List of Gymnopilus species

References

aculeatus
Fungi described in 1890
Taxa named by Casimir Roumeguère
Taxa named by Giacomo Bresadola